That's My Work, Volume 1 is a collaborative mixtape by American rappers Snoop Dogg, Tha Dogg Pound, and others. It was released free for digital download via SoundCloud on November 27, 2012. It is the first mixtape in the That's My Work series, being followed by That's My Work 2 in 2013.

Track listing

References 

2012 mixtape albums
Tha Dogg Pound albums
Snoop Dogg albums